Brian Murphy (born May 24, 1941 in Kingston, Ontario; d. October 31, 2005 in Ottawa, Ontario) was a broadcaster and music historian.  He is particularly noted for his association with Ottawa radio station CHEZ-FM between 1977 and 1993.

History 
Murphy's career was closely intertwined with that of Ottawa record retailer, music promoter and radio station owner Harvey Glatt.  While still in his teens, Murphy commenced working for Glatt at Glatt's flagship Treble Clef record store on Sparks Street in Ottawa, ultimately becoming the manager of the store.  Murphy later developed a weekend overnight radio show, Free Form Radio, on Ottawa's CKBY-FM station.  When Glatt started CHEZ-FM, in 1977, Murphy joined the station as its first Music Director, based on the reputation he had developed for identifying and promoting popular music that wasn't found on most radio playlists.   Murphy ultimately developed three weekly radio shows on which he regularly appeared:  The Source, Blues 106 and Jazz 106.

Murphy's position at CHEZ was eliminated in the summer of 1993, amidst a change at the station to a "Classic Rock" format.  Murphy never returned to radio, and went into a period of slow decline from 1993 until his death twelve years later.  He supported himself through providing mix tapes to commercial establishments, as well as selling most of his record collection.

In 2000, Murphy was the recipient of the Blues Heart Award from the Ottawa Blues Society, awarded annually to "an individual or organization that has made an outstanding contribution to fostering appreciation and awareness of blues music".

In 2006, the Brian Murphy award was established with the Ottawa-Carleton School Board, to be given annually to the graduating student chosen by teachers as best representing Brian's characteristics of knowledge, passion, and generosity in music.

References 

Canadian radio personalities
People from Kingston, Ontario
1941 births
2005 deaths